The following is a list of basketball players by total career points scored. It includes points scored in national league and cup games, national team, international club matches, All-Star games and also college basketball.

Brazilian Oscar Schmidt is basketball's all-time topscorer with 54,145 points scored in a 29-year span career. He also holds the record for most points for a national team, with 7,693 in 326 games for Brazil, while he was selected by the 1984 NBA Draft (same year like Michael Jordan) by the New Jersey Nets. Nevertheless he never played in the NBA. Second on the list is Kareem Abdul-Jabbar, NBA's all-time leading scorer with 40,963 career points.

Other legendary players who did not make the list but have achieved the highest all-time scoring records in domestic leagues -other than NBA- are Hervé Dubuisson with 19,013 points in the French league, Andrew Gaze with 18,908 points in the NBL, Ramon Fernandez with 18,996 points in the PBA, Wilfredo Ruiz with 18,512 in the Uruguayan League, Hector Campana with 17,359 points in Argentina's league, George Torres with 15,863 pts in Puerto Rico's league, Louie Dampier with 13,276 points in ABA, Antonello Riva with 14,397 in Serie A, and Nick Galis with 12,864 points in the Greek league.

Players
As of 27 September 2022

See also
List of basketball players who have scored 100 points in a single game 
FIBA Basketball World Cup records
List of games played between NBA and international teams
EuroLeague career statistical leaders
List of National Basketball Association career scoring leaders

Notes

References

External links
Basketball-Reference.com enumeration of NBA career leaders in points scored
National Basketball Association official website enumeration of NBA career leaders in points scored

Basketball statistics